Josia gigantea is a moth of the family Notodontidae first described by Herbert Druce in 1885. It is found from southern Mexico to Colombia.

Larvae have been recorded on Passiflora sexflora and Passiflora apatela in Costa Rica.

External links
"Josia gigantea (Druce 1885)". Tree of Life Web Project. Retrieved December 29, 2019.

Notodontidae of South America
Moths described in 1885